Dzmitry Lebedzew (born 13 May 1986) is a Belarusian professional footballer who plays as a forward for Ostrovets.

His brother Alyaksandr Lebedzew is also a professional footballer.

Career
Born in Soligorsk, Lebedzew began playing football in FC Shakhtyor Soligorsk's youth system. He didn't make any senior appearances for the club, and moved to FC Smorgon where he made his Belarusian Premier League debut in 2007.

References

External links
 Profile at kick-off.by
 
 

1986 births
Living people
People from Salihorsk
Sportspeople from Minsk Region
Belarusian footballers
Association football forwards
FC Smorgon players
FC Vitebsk players
FC Neman Grodno players
FC Gorodeya players
FC Krumkachy Minsk players
FC Belshina Bobruisk players
FC Ostrovets players